Tahmašši, or Takhmašši, and also known by his hypocoristicon or pet name: Tahmaya, or Atahmaya was an Egyptian official to pharaoh in the 1350 BC Amarna letters correspondence. His name comes from: 'Ptah-mes', meaning Ptah-Born, or "Born of Ptah".

Tahmašši's name is used in 4 Amarna letters as follows-(EA for 'el Amarna'):
EA 265–Tahmaya, Tahmaya
EA 303–Tahmašši
EA 316–Tahmaya
EA 364–Atahmaya—See Ayyab of Aštartu-(Tell-Ashtara)

The letters

EA 265: "A gift acknowledged"
Letter two of three letters by Tagi of Ginti, (Gintikirmil).
"To the king, my lord: Message of Tagi, your servant. I fall at the feet of the king, my lord. My own man I sent along with [ ... ] to see the face of the king, my lord. [And] the king, my lord, [s]ent a present to me in the care of Tahmaya, and Tahmaya gave (me) a gold goblet and 1[2 se]ts of linen garments. For the information [of the kin]g, my lord.  -EA 265, lines 1-15 (~complete)

EA 303: "Careful listening"
Letter three of five letters by Šubandu, a mayor in Palestine.
"To the king, my lord, my god, my Sun, the Sun from the sky: Message of Šubandu, your servant, and the dirt at your feet, the groom of your horses. I prostrate myself, on the stomach and on the back, at the feet of the king, my lord, the Sun from the sky, 7 times and 7 times.  I have heard [a]ll the words of the king, my [lord], the Sun from the [s]ky, and I am indeed [g]uarding the place [of the kin]g where I am. I have listened [t]o Tahmašši [ve]ry carefully.  -EA 303, lines 1-21 (complete)

EA 316: "Postscript to the royal scribe"
Letter three of three letters by Pu-Ba'lu to pharaoh, mayor of Yursa:
"[To the kin]g, m[y] lord, [my] god, my Sun fr[o]m the s[ky: Mess]age of Pu-B[a]'lu, your servant and the dirt at your feet, the [gr]oom of your horses. I fall at the feet of the king, my lord, my god, my Sun from the sky, 7 times and [7] times, on the back and on the stomach. I am indeed guarding the pla[ce of the kin]g carefully. And who is the dog that would [ne]gl[ec]t [the comma]nd of the king? I am indeed obeying the orders of [Ta]hm[ay]a, the commissioner of the king.
To the scribe of [my lord: Me]ssage of Pu-Ba'lu. I fal[l] at your feet. There was nothing in my h[ou]se when I [en]ter[ed] it, and so I have not sent a caravan to you. I am now preparing a fine caravan for you."  -EA 316, lines 1-25 (complete)

See also
Amarna letters–phrases and quotations, for: "7 times and 7 times, "on the back and on the stomach"."

References

Moran, William L. The Amarna Letters. Johns Hopkins University Press, 1987, 1992. (softcover)
Rainey, 1970. El Amarna Tablets, 359-379, Anson F. Rainey, (AOAT 8, Alter Orient Altes Testament 8, Kevelaer and Neukirchen -Vluyen), 1970, 107 pages.

Amarna letters officials